WWSC (1450 AM) is a commercial radio station broadcasting a classic rock radio format. Licensed to Glens Falls, New York, the station serves Warren, Washington, and northern Saratoga counties (from which the WWSC call letters are derived). It is owned by Regional Radio Group, LLC. WWSC originally signed on in 1946.

WWSC is powered at 1,000 watts by day.  It drops its power slightly to 940 watts at night to protect other stations on 1450 AM when radio waves travel further.  Programming is also heard on FM translator 93.1 W226CP.  The station brands itself around the translator's dial position, calling itself "93 WSC."

Previous talk programming
On weekdays, national syndicated programs heard on WWSC began with Hugh Hewitt, followed by Mike Gallagher, Dennis Prager, The Dave Ramsey Show, Lars Larson, John Batchelor, Red Eye Radio with Eric Harley and Gary McNamara and This Morning, America's First News with Gordon Deal.  Local talk shows included Off the Rails with Gonzo Gates on Mondays and I'm In with the Adirondack Regional Chamber of Commerce Fridays.

WWSC weekends included The Bobby Likis Car Clinic, The Weekend with Joe Pags, The Frommers Travel Show, At Home with Gary Sullivan, Ron Ananian, The Car Doctor and Healthtalk with Dr. Ronald Hoffman.

WWSC featured coverage of local high school football, basketball and hockey.  WWSC's sports coverage garnered multiple New York State Broadcasters awards.  WWSC was one of the stations on the Adirondack Thunder ECHL Hockey Team Radio Network.

History
It was owned by Great Northern Radio with its studios at 11 South Street. WWSC was a network affiliate of the Mutual Broadcasting System and later ABC. At first it was powered at only 250 watts. But by the 1950s, the daytime power was boosted to 1,000 watts, while it continued to broadcast at 250 watts at night.

In 1959, WWSC was acquired by Normandy Broadcasting.  It featured a full service middle of the road format of popular music, news and sports.  In September 1967, it added an FM companion, WWSC-FM 95.9 (now WCQL Queensbury, New York).  At first WWSC-FM simulcast the AM station but later began airing an automated Top 40 sound.

In the 1990s, as listeners increasingly turned to FM radio for music, WWSC completed its transition to a talk format.  In 2008, WWSC was acquired by the Regional Radio Group LLC.

On May 14, 2021, WWSC changed their format from talk to classic rock, branded as “93 WSC The Legend”.

References

External links

WSC
Radio stations established in 1946
1946 establishments in New York (state)
Classic rock radio stations in the United States